Occupational cancer is cancer caused by occupational hazards. Several cancers have been directly tied to occupational hazards, including chimney sweeps' carcinoma, mesothelioma, and others.

Types of hazards 
Occupational exposure to chemicals, dusts, radiation, and certain industrial processes have been tied to occupational cancer. Exposure to cancer-causing chemicals (carcinogens) may cause mutations that allow cells to grow out of control, causing cancer. Carcinogens in the workplace may include chemicals like anilines, chromates, dinitrotoluenes, arsenic and inorganic arsenic compounds, beryllium and beryllium compounds, cadmium compounds, and nickel compounds. Dusts that can cause cancer leather or wood dusts, asbestos, crystalline forms of silica, coal tar pitch volatiles, coke oven emissions, diesel exhaust and environmental tobacco smoke. sunlight; radon gas; and industrial, medical, or other exposure to ionizing radiation can all cause cancer in the workplace. Industrial processes associated with cancer include aluminum production; iron and steel founding; and underground mining with exposure to uranium or radon. Shift work, which can disturb the circadian rhythm, has also been identified as a risk factor for some forms of cancer, in particular for breast cancer. 

Other risk factors for cancer include:
 Personal characteristics such as age, sex, and race
 Family history of cancer
 Being overweight or having obesity
 Diet and personal habits such as tobacco use and alcohol consumption
 The presence of certain medical conditions or past medical treatments, including chemotherapy, radiation treatment, or some immune-system suppressing drugs
 Certain infectious agents (viruses, bacteria, parasites) including Human Papillomaviruses, Epstein-Barr Virus, Hepatitis B Virus, Hepatitis C Virus,  and Helicobacter pylori
 Exposure to cancer-causing agents in the environment (for example, sunlight, radon gas, air pollution)

Types of cancers 
Common cancers and their exposures and occupations include:

Occupations at higher risk

Firefighters 

Firefighters have shown higher rates of certain types of cancer (respiratory, digestive, and urinary systems), and of all cancers combined, when compared to the general U.S. population.

Due to the lack of central and comprehensive sources of data, research on cancer rates amongst firefighters has been challenging.  On July 7, 2018, Congress passed the Firefighter Cancer Registry Act of 2018 requiring the Centers for Disease Control and Prevention to create the National Firefighter Registry designed to collect data on cancer rates among U.S. firefighters.

Epidemiology
An estimated 48,000 cancers are diagnosed yearly in the US that come from occupational causes; this represents approximately 4-10% of total cancer in the United States. It is estimated that 19% of cancers globally are attributed to environmental exposures (including work-related exposures). It is estimated that there are approximately 120,000 work-related cancer cases annually in the EU due to exposure to carcinogens at work.

Prevention 
Many occupational cancers are preventable. Personal protective gear, workplace controls, and worker education can prevent exposure to carcinogens in the workplace. Tobacco smoking has also been shown to increase the risk of work-related cancers; decreasing or abstaining from smoking can decrease cancer risk.

Agencies like the US Food and Drug Administration, Environmental Protection Agency, the International Agency for Research on Cancer (IARC) and Occupational Safety and Health Administration have developed safety standards and limits for chemical and radiation exposure. International Labour Organization has also adopted Occupation Cancer Convention (C139) in 1979 for improvement of workplace safety conditions.

References